Brian Belichick is an American football coach who is the safeties coach for the New England Patriots of the National Football League (NFL).

Early years
Belichick played lacrosse at The Rivers School and Suffield Academy where he was an All-League selection in football and lacrosse. He then played collegiate lacrosse at Trinity College, graduating in 2016.

Coaching career

New England Patriots
On July 21, 2016, the New England Patriots publicly confirmed that Brian Belichick had been hired as a scouting assistant, which was to be his first and only year working in the front office. He began assisting the coaching staff with film breakdowns during the team's Super Bowl LI winning playoff run before transitioning to a coaching assistant role the following season. Belichick served as a coaching assistant for three years (2017–2019) before being promoted to Safeties Coach, a position previously held by his elder brother Stephen until July 2020 when it was announced that the latter would be named Outside Linebackers Coach. During that stretch, he won his first Super Bowl title when the Patriots defeated the Los Angeles Rams in Super Bowl LIII.

Personal life
Belichick is the son of current New England Patriots head coach Bill Belichick, and grandson of Steve Belichick.  His elder sister, Amanda Belichick, is a lacrosse coach currently serving as Head Coach of the women's program at Holy Cross. His elder brother, Stephen, serves as the organization's Outside Linebackers coach. On Saturday, June 26, 2021, Brian married Catherine "Callie" D. McLaughlin on Nantucket Island, Massachusetts at St. Mary's Church and had the reception at Sankaty Head Beach Club.

References

External links
 Patriots coaches, Brian Belichick

Living people
New England Patriots coaches
New England Patriots scouts
Trinity Bantams athletes
Year of birth missing (living people)
Belichick family